Kʼinich Ahkal Moʼ Nahb III also known as Chaacal III and Akul Anab III, (13 September 678–c.736), was an ajaw of the Maya city of Palenque. He took the throne on 30 December 721, reigning until c.736.

Biography 
Ahkal Moʼ Nahb was born to nobleman Tiwol Chan Mat and Lady Kinuw, his probably brother was Kʼinich Janaab Pakal II. He was married to Lady Men Nik and was succeeded by his son ajaw Kʼinich Kʼukʼ Bahlam II. Ahkal Moʼ Nahb III was born in 678, during the reign of his grandfather, Palenque's long-lived ruler Kʼinich Janaab Pakal I, often referred to as "Pakal the Great", because this ruler righted a kingdom that had been destabilized by enemy attacks and oversaw a building program that culminated in the Temple of the Inscriptions. His construction program rivaled that of his predecessors, in the newly discovered inscriptions of Temple XIX he contributed enormously to the surviving records of Palenque history. The monuments and text associated with Ahkal Moʼ Nahb III are: Temple XVIII texts, Temple XIX bench and texts, Temple XXI texts, Tablets of the Orator and Scribe, Bundle Panel and House E Painted text?.

Notes

Sources

External links 
 Kʼinich Ahkal Moʼ Naabʼ III: Just who was this amazing king?

678 births
730s deaths
Rulers of Palenque
8th-century monarchs in North America
8th century in the Maya civilization